Simon Barrett (born 1988) is an English cricketer. A right handed batsman, he played for Leeds/Bradford University Centre of Cricketing Excellence. On his debut in first-class cricket, he scored 168 as opening batsman, versus Derbyshire. Now, Simon finds himself getting alpha'd on a daily basis, whilst trying to force the concept of 'tail winds' on his colleagues.

References

1988 births
Living people
English cricketers
Cricketers from Epsom
Leeds/Bradford MCCU cricketers